Clarence Gilbert Taylor (September 8, 1898 – March 29, 1988) was an early aviation entrepreneur and co-founder of the Taylor Brothers Aircraft Corporation (later named the Piper Aircraft Corporation) in Rochester, New York. He was the designer of the Taylor Cub, which led to the creation of the Piper Cub, one of the most popular airplanes in history.

Biography
Gilbert was born on September 8, 1898 in Rochester, New York to Arthur and Clara (née Makin) Taylor, who had immigrated to the United States from Nottingham, England in 1889. He was one of six children that included Gordon A. Taylor (Jan. 15, 1902 — Apr. 24, 1928). Gilbert co-founded the Taylor Brothers Aircraft Corporation with Gordon in 1927. A year later, Gordon was killed, along with an early sales agent for the brothers' aircraft, during a demonstration flight for a prototype of the airplane "Chummy" at the Ford Airport in Dearborn, Michigan.

After his brother's death, Gilbert moved the company to Bradford, Pennsylvania, where he remained until 1936. During his time in Bradford, the company was renamed to the Taylor Aircraft Company after investor William T. Piper bought the assets of the company in 1930. Piper kept Gilbert on as president, but after clashes between the two, Piper bought Gilbert out and he left to start Taylorcraft Aviation in 1935. Two years later, Piper renamed the company to what is now known as Piper Aircraft. It went on to build more than 20,000 Taylor-designed Piper Cubs, the most-produced fabric-covered aircraft of all time.

References

External links
C. G. Taylor - Pioneers of Flight from the Smithsonian National Air and Space Museum

American aviation businesspeople
Aviation pioneers
1898 births
1988 deaths
Businesspeople from Rochester, New York
Aviators from Pennsylvania
Aircraft designers
American people of English descent
20th-century American businesspeople